Nicole Byer (born August 29, 1986) is an American comedian, actress, and television host. She is known as the host of the Netflix comedic reality bake-off series Nailed It! (2018–present), for which she received two Primetime Emmy Award nominations.

Byer gained recognition for her work in the commentary series Girl Code (2013). Byer later starred in the MTV/Facebook Watch comedy series Loosely Exactly Nicole (2016–2018), which was based on her real life experiences. She made several guest appearances in such comedy series as 30 Rock (2012), Family Guy (2016), Transparent (2016–2017), The Good Place (2019), Brooklyn Nine-Nine (2019–2021), and The Simpsons (2019). She also appeared in films, including Other People (2016), All About Nina (2018), Bad Hair (2020), and Valley Girl (2020). In 2021, Byer began co-hosting Wipeout with John Cena.

Byer is the host of the Team Coco podcast Why Won't You Date Me?, the Earwolf podcast Best Friends co-hosted with Sasheer Zamata, and the Headgum podcast Newcomers.

Byer's first full-length special, Nicole Byer: BBW (Big Beautiful Weirdo), premiered on Netflix in December 2021 and earned her an Emmy nomination for Outstanding Writing for a Variety Special.

Early life
Byer was born and raised in New Jersey and moved to New York City in the early 2000s. She worked there as a waitress for a restaurant and cabaret club. She described how the experience eventually led to her to studying improv, "They would give me a lot of money because they were like, 'You're very funny. You have to get out of here. You're very bad at this [waiting tables].'" Byer's parents both died when she was young, her mother while Nicole was a teen in high school, and her father when she was 21. She has said that comedy helped her work through both her parents' deaths, "it was a blessing that I had found these things before they passed away so I could escape."

She then took classes at the Upright Citizens Brigade, starting improv and sketch comedy in June 2008, the same month that her father died. She continued with improv and sketch comedy for many years before starting her stand-up career in 2013. Byer graduated from the American Musical and Dramatic Academy Certificate Program in Professional Performance.

Career
She tours the United States doing stand-up comedy and regularly performs improv with Upright Citizens Brigade in Los Angeles.

TV
Byer began appearing on Girl Code on MTV in 2013. In 2014, she hosted the first season of MTV's Are You the One? The Aftermatch Live, an after-show for Are You the One?. She appeared in several roles on network television in 2016. That year, she had supporting roles on three shows: MTV's commentary show Girl Code; a hidden camera prank show Ladylike, also on MTV; and she was a series regular on the Fox show Party Over Here, a half-hour sketch comedy created by Paul Scheer and Lonely Island, which was cancelled after one season. As a commentator on the show Girl Code, she was described by Maitri Mehta at Bustle as a "beloved talking head"; Stephanie Merry at The Washington Post called Byer "one of the most dependably funny commentators" on the show.

Byer has guest-starred in several shows including BoJack Horseman, Transparent, and Bob's Burgers. She played Lizette in season 5, episode 7 of the Freeform series Young & Hungry in 2017. She appeared as a guest judge on the third season of RuPaul's Drag Race: All Stars.

Nailed It! 
Since March 2018, Byer has hosted the Netflix original bake-off series Nailed It! alongside head judge chocolatier Jacques Torres. Each episode features three home bakers with a "terrible track record" attempting to recreate extremely complicated pastries for a $10,000 prize. Byer received a nomination for the Primetime Emmy Award for Outstanding Host for a Reality or Competition Program three (in 2020 and 2021 and 2022). She is the first Black woman to be nominated in the category.

Because her comedy is "not kid-friendly", her commentary is edited to create the "feel-good G-rated comedy" that the show is known for. An entire season is shot in only 13 days.

Loosely Exactly Nicole 

In 2016, MTV premiered Loosely Exactly Nicole, a scripted, single-camera comedy written and starring Byer, based on her life. Madeleine Davies at Jezebel described the show's premise as a "comedic look on [Byer's] life as a black actress struggling to make it in Hollywood." Loosely Exactly Nicole premiered September 5, 2016 on MTV. It was later cancelled after one season. Shortly after, it was picked up by Facebook Watch for a second season.

Wipeout 
Byer co-hosts the latest version of Wipeout with John Cena on TBS.

Podcasts
Byer is the host of four podcasts: Why Won't You Date Me?, Best Friends!, 90 Day Bae, and Newcomers.

Why Won't You Date Me? 
In December 2017, Byer launched a weekly podcast Why Won't You Date Me? on the HeadGum podcast network. Each episode features a guest, typically another comedian, with whom Byer converses openly about her limited dating history, past sexual experiences, and frustration with being single. The guest also critiques her Tinder profile. Byer concludes each show by asking the guest host if they would date her. Past guests include her very close friend Sasheer Zamata, Emily Heller, and Brooks Wheelan. Critics have referred to the show as "bold" and "refreshing." In 2021, the show left HeadGum to join Conan O'Brien's Team Coco podcast network.

Best Friends! 
In 2019, Byer, alongside Sasheer Zamata, launched a podcast on the Earwolf podcast network, Best Friends, a weekly podcast in which the two ruminate on the nature of friendship.  Guest episodes have included such pairs such as actresses June Diane Raphael and Casey Wilson, drag queens Katya Zamolodchikova and Trixie Mattel, and internet personalities Keith Habersberger and Zach Kornfeld of The Try Guys. The same year, Byer joined comedian and actor Mano Agapion as a co-host on the RuPaul's Drag Race recap podcast Drag Her, and became a cohost of the 90 Day Fiance recap podcast 90 Day Bae with Marcy Jarreau.

Newcomers 
In 2020, Byer launched a weekly podcast, Newcomers, on the HeadGum podcast network alongside Lauren Lapkus, in which the two friends watch films for the first time and comment on their feelings on each movie as newcomers to the series. Each episode features a guest who provides more background on the series and characters. Past guests have included John Gemberling, Demi Adejuyigbe, Paul F. Tompkins, and Betsy Sodaro.

Season one covered the Star Wars franchise and The Lord of the Rings in the second. The third season explored Tyler Perry's body of work and the fourth goes through the Fast & Furious franchise, with a new co-host, Jon Gabrus as a guide. The fifth season is covering selections from the Marvel Cinematic Universe.

Book 
Her first book #VERYFAT #VERYBRAVE: The Fat Girl's Guide to Being #Brave and Not a Dejected, Melancholy, Down-in-the-Dumps Weeping Fat Girl in a Bikini was released in 2020. The book features over 100 photos of Byer in bikinis with much of the book written through captions, making it both a comedy book and a photo book. Byer has explained the long title, "I, Nicole Byer, wrote this book to #1, share my impressive bikini collection and my hot body with the world, and #2, help other people feel #brave by embracing their body as it is." The title began as a joke hashtag on Instagram, making fun of the way people often comment on photos of fat women wearing relatively little clothing as, 'You're so brave.'

Other work 
In 2013, Byer and Sasheer Zamata created and starred in a web series called Pursuit of Sexiness which was produced by Upright Citizens Brigade.

In 2018, she appeared in a Smirnoff ad campaign with actor Ted Danson.

Comedic style
On The Ringer, Allison P. Davis described Byer's comedy: "Most easily compared to a raunchier Retta with a hint of Ilana Glazer's madcap energy. She's mouthy, vulgar, a little bit goofy, relatable but ridiculously charming, and not afraid to infuse her broad comedy with a confident sexuality." Writing for USA Today, Jaleesa M. Jones said that "it's precisely [Byer's] brazen, ribald brand of comedy that landed her in the creative incubator that is MTV, where she toplines two new comedy shows in 2016, Ladylike and Loosely Exactly Nicole".

Byer described Whoopi Goldberg, Tina Turner, and Mo'Nique as her early inspirations.

Commentary on racism in the industry 
Byer has been vocal about a casting experience where she was asked to act out stereotypical blackness, including making a comedy sketch about it. Nicole tells the story of auditioning for Nestle, "So the cast director was a white lady ... and she was like, "OK, Nicole, how do I say this — I need you to be as black as possible, and if you go too black, I'll bring you back." And in my head I was like, "What does that mean?" [...] it's hurtful when you realize: Oh, Hollywood understands one type of black. And there isn't just one type of black — just like there isn't one type of white. Like, Emma Stone, Emma Roberts — all these girls get to exist and they don't have to be one thing. They can be anything they want. And we have to be just one thing."Byer also recollects when she was younger and adults would comment on how well-spoken she was and it took her into adulthood to recognize that as the microaggression it is.

After years of on-set makeup artists not knowing how to work on her dark skin, Byer learned how to do her own makeup. Similar issues with hairstylists caused Byer to start buying and wearing wigs, instead of dealing with people who did not know how to do her hair and get her ready to be on screen.

Personal life
Byer supports body positivity and stated in an interview with Brit+Co, "Body positivity, to me, means you accept the body that you're in... And if you want to change it, you can, but you should love the skin that you're in currently, forever. Because everyone is beautiful. No one's truly ugly. You're always beautiful to somebody, and you're always ugly to somebody."

On her sexual orientation, Byer has said that she "doesn't identify as straight", but is uncomfortable with the labels "bisexual" or "queer." She has stated on her podcast Why Won't You Date Me? that she is open to dating people of any gender, and has dated men and women in the past.

She lives in Los Angeles with her two rescue dogs named Clyde and Charlie. She previously lived with fellow comedian John Milhiser.

Filmography

Film

Television

Podcasts

Web Series

Awards and nominations

References

External links
 
 

Living people
American sketch comedians
Place of birth missing (living people)
American television actresses
Upright Citizens Brigade Theater performers
American women comedians
Middletown High School South alumni
People from Middletown Township, New Jersey
American women podcasters
American podcasters
21st-century American comedians
Comedians from New Jersey
1986 births
American stand-up comedians
LGBT African Americans
American LGBT comedians
LGBT actresses
Actresses from New Jersey
American television hosts
American women television presenters
American voice actresses
African-American female comedians
African-American women writers
21st-century American actresses
21st-century African-American women
21st-century African-American people
20th-century African-American people
20th-century African-American women
American Musical and Dramatic Academy alumni